The Miss Perú 2005 was held on April 16, 2005. That year, 25 candidates were competing for the national crown. Three winners were chosen to represent Peru at the Miss Universe 2005 pageant which was held in Thailand and the Miss World 2005 pageant, which was held in China, and the Miss Earth 2005.

Placements

Special Awards

 Best Regional Costume - Lambayeque - Vanessa Chanta
 Miss Photogenic - Amazonas - Diana Goytizolo
 Miss Elegance - Ucayali - Tracy Freundt
 Miss Body - Tumbes - Fiorella Castellano
 Best Hair - Cajamarca - Débora Sulca
 Miss Congeniality - Huánuco - Myriam Chacón
 Most Beautiful Face - Amazonas - Diana Goytizolo
 Best Smile - Ica - Fátima Retamozo
 Miss Internet - Ucayali - Tracy Freundt

Delegates

Amazonas - Diana Audria Goytizolo Do Vilela
Áncash - Flor de María Aciam Villaroel
Apurímac - Deborah Dhely Inga Whertens
Arequipa - Natalia Pozo Olivera
Ayacucho - Claudia Montoya Seggi
Cajamarca - Débora Sulca Cravero
Callao - Massiel Vidal Torino
Cuzco - Sara María Paredes Valdivia
Huancavelica - Patricia del Castillo Paredes
Huánuco - Myriam Chacón Tavera
Ica - Fátima Retamozo Hernandez
Junín - Giovanna Figallo Hara
La Libertad - Fiorella Flores Ortega

Lambayeque - Vanessa Lyisina Chanta Cano
Loreto - Jennifer Álvarez Vela
Madre de Dios - Brenda Patricia Añi Stevens
Moquegua - Verónica Susan Tamashiro Luna
Pasco - Llubica Zimić Klevatzević
Piura - Ivette Wendy Borrero Quezada
Puno - Gabriela Sandra Márquez Ramirez
Region Lima - Brenda Rodríguez Crawford
San Martín - Mariana Valencia Sangama
Tacna - Fiorella Basadre Natal
Tumbes - Fiorella Castellano Reynosa
Ucayali - Tracy Freundt

Background Music

Opening Show – Bananarama - "Venus"
Swimsuit Competition – Jesse McCartney & Anne Hathaway - "Don't Go Breakin' My Heart"
Evening Gown Competition – Air Supply - "Every Woman In The World"
Top 5 - Final Look – Alex Britti, Joe Cocker & Luciano Pavarotti - "You Are So Beautiful"

References

External links
Nueva Miss Peru 2005
 Crowning Miss Peru 2005

Miss Peru
2005 beauty pageants
2005 in Peru